Eyewitness is the seventh studio album released by the band Royal Hunt.

Track listing
All songs written by André Andersen.
 "Hunted" – 5:06
 "Can't Let Go" – 5:02
 "The Prayer" – 3:29
 "Edge of the World" – 6:14
 "Burning the Sun" – 6:10
 "Wicked Lounge" – 3:49
 "5th Element" (Instrumental) – 4:10
 "Help Us God" – 6:47
 "Game of Fear" – 4:33
 "Eyewitness" – 5:08
Japan edition adds the following
  "Day Is Dawning" (Andersen/West) - 3:46
Special digipack edition (FR CD 147D) adds the following
  "Martial Arts" (Instrumental) – 2:59
 "Follow Me" (Live version recorded on Japanese tour 2002) – 5:33

Personnel
André Andersen – keyboards and rhythm guitar
John West – vocals
Steen Mogensen – bass guitar
Jacob Kjaer – lead guitar
Allan Tschicaja – drums
Steve Daniels – saxophone
Maria McTurk – backing vocals
Kenny Lubcke – backing vocals
Laura Faurschou – backing vocals 
Soma Allpas – cello

External links
Heavy Harmonies page

Royal Hunt albums
2003 albums
Frontiers Records albums